Castelnou is a commune in the Pyrénées-Orientales department in southern France.

Geography

Localisation 
Castelnou is located in the canton of Les Aspres and in the arrondissement of Perpignan.

Population

Sites of interest 
 Château de Castelnou : the medieval castle.
 The old village, labelled as Plus Beaux Villages de France.
 The church of Sainte-Marie du Mercadal, from the 13th century.
 The tower of Castelnou, a former watch tower.

Gallery

See also
Communes of the Pyrénées-Orientales department

References

Communes of Pyrénées-Orientales
Plus Beaux Villages de France